Melica teneriffae, is a grass species in the family Poaceae that is endemic to the Canary Islands.

Description
The leaf-sheaths are tubular. They also have scabrous surface.

The spikelets themselves are made out of 1–2 fertile florets and are diminished at the apex.

It surface is asperulous, while it margins are ciliated and hairy on the bottom. The apex of the lemma is obtuse. Both the lower and upper glumes are ovate, keelless, membranous, and have acute apexes. Palea have ciliolated keels and is 2-veined. Flowers are fleshy, oblong, truncate, have 2 lodicules, 3 stamens and grow together. The fruits are caryopses and have an adherent pericarp with linear hilum.

References

teneriffae
Flora of Africa
Taxa named by Eduard Hackel